This is a list of international schools in Madagascar.

English-language schools
American School of Antananarivo (PreK/12 - from pre-kindergarten through high school)

 British School of Madagascar (Education from 2-18 following the British curriculum)

French schools
Preschool (maternelle) through senior high school (lycée):
 Lycée Français de Tananarive in Antananarivo
 Collèges de France in Antananarivo
 École de l'Alliance française d'Antsahabe in Antananarivo
 Lycée Peter Pan in Antananarivo
 Lycée La Clairefontaine in Antananarivo
 Lycée Français de Tamatave in Toamasina

Preschool (maternelle) through junior high school (collège):
 Collège français Jules-Verne in Antsirabe
 Lycée Français Sadi-Carnot in Antsiranana - Previously served preschool through senior high school.
 Collège français René-Cassin in Fianarantsoa
 Collège français Françoise-Dolto in Majunga
 Collège Étienne-de-Flacourt in Toliara (Tuléar)

Junior high school (collège):
 École La Clairefontaine in Tôlanaro (Fort Dauphin) - Previously served preschool through senior high school.

Preschool (maternelle) through primary school (primaire):
 École Bird in Antananarivo
 École primaire française Charles-Baudelaire in Ambanja
 École primaire française d'Antalaha
 École primaire française de Fort-Dauphin in Tôlanaro
 École primaire française Les Pangalanes in Manakara
 École primaire française de Mananjary
 École primaire française Lamartine in Nosy Bé

Former schools:
 École française du lac Alaotra in Ambatondrazaka - Preschool to primary school
 École de l'Alliance in Morondava - Preschool to primary school
 École de la Francophonie in Anantanarivo, preschool through primary school
 École Sully in Anantanrivo, preschool through primary school

References

 
Madagascar